Żędowice  is a village in the administrative district of Gmina Zawadzkie, within Strzelce County, Opole Voivodeship, in southern Poland.

The village has a population of 2,500.

History
In the 10th century the area became part of the emerging Polish state, and later on, it was part of Poland, Bohemia (Czechia), Prussia, and Germany. During World War II, the Germans operated the E575 forced labour subcamp of the Stalag VIII-B/344 prisoner-of-war camp in the village. After Germany's defeat in the war, in 1945, the village became again part of Poland.

Transport
There is a train station in Żędowice, and the Voivodeship road 901 passes through the village.

References

Villages in Strzelce County